A stubroutine (also known as a stub function, null script, null subroutine, or null function) is a command script or program subroutine which does nothing but return a constant value. They are used during program development, where the functional implementation of routines is delayed while other routines are developed. This is also one of the techniques used by the software cracking community to bypass callbacks and license-checking code: the target program is disassembled and the appropriate code is substituted for a null subroutine that just returns the value expected by the caller.

Subroutines